1,2-Cyclopentanedione is the organic compound with the formula (CH2)3(CO)2.  It is one of two isomeric cyclopentanediones, the other being 1,3-cyclopentanedione.  It was first prepared by base-induced condensation of di
ethylglutarate with diethyloxalate, followed by hydrolysis of the resulting diketodiester followed by decarboxylation. 
The enol is predicted to be about 1-3 kcal/mol more stable than the diketo form.  The enol structure has been confirmed by X-ray crystallography.

Structurally related to 1,2-cyclopentanedione is 2-hydroxy-3-methyl-2-cyclopenten-1-one is a flavor additive, also called cyclotene.

References

Diketones
Cyclic ketones